The following is a list of wars involving Angola.

List 

Wars involving Angola
Angola
Wars